Boa Esperança is a future monorail station of São Paulo Metro. It will serve Line 15-Silver, which connects the nearby neighbourhood to the Metro Line 2-Green in Vila Prudente. It will be located at Avenida Ragueb Chohfi, 3002.

The station is part of the  expansion plan towards Jacu-Pêssego.

Toponymy
In 2009, when the line project was publicly presented, the station was temporarily named as Jequiriçá, a street located next to the station. After toponymic studies, the station was renamed to Boa Esperança, the nearest neighbourhood of the station.

Station layout

References

São Paulo Metro stations
Proposed railway stations in Brazil
Railway stations scheduled to open in 2025